Baruničina ljubav (lit. "Baroness’ love") is a novel written by Croatian writer Ante Kovačić. He dedicated this novel to his wife Milka, naming one character after her.

Baruničina ljubav was published in 1877 and appeared in Vijenac (literary magazine).

Kovačić discussed Baruničina ljubav with Rikard Jorgovanić in 1878.

When he was writing Baruničina ljubav, Kovačić was influenced by Eugène Sue and French novelist Honoré de Balzac. He described the Oedipus complex.

Kovačić was born in Hrvatsko Zagorje and wanted to describe that region in his works. He described it in Baruničina ljubav perfectly.

Characters 
Baroness Sofija Martinić (née Grefštein)
Ivan Martinić – Sofija’s husband
Pavao Lanosović – son of Sofija and Ivan, adopted by farmers and seduced by his mother
Milka Stalićeva
Mirko Stalić – Milka’s father and Ivan’s best friend
Julijo Krčelić – Sofija’s lover
Jakob – servant

Sources

External links 
 Baruničina ljubav; Fiškal; Među žabari: Ante Kovačić by Hrvojka Mihanović-Salopek

1877 Croatian novels
Novels set in Croatia
Novels about psychoanalysis